Ignat Zemchenko (born April 24, 1992) is a Ukrainian-Russian professional ice hockey player currently playing with HC Yugra in the Supreme Hockey League (VHL). He was selected by Severstal Cherepovets 10th overall in the 2009 KHL Junior Draft, and made his KHL debut in the 2009–10 KHL season. He played for Russia in the 2012 IIHF World U20 Championship. Ignat Zemchenko is the son  of Serhiy Zemchenko, a former Ukrainian professional ice hockey player known for his time with Sokil Kyiv.

Playing career
Zemchenko began playing hockey in his birthplace Kyiv, Ukraine. Later on his father, Serhiy, left the country to coach hockey in Spain for seven years, causing the family to relocate; and where Ignat would continue to learn the game. In 2004 his father again relocated, this time to coach PHC Krylya Sovetov based in Moscow. Ignat too would join the Krylya Sovetov hockey system.

In the 2011-12 KHL season, Zemchenko's father, Serhiy, would act as coach  of Almaz Cherepovets.

International play
While both his father Serhiy and older brother Ihor have played internationally for Ukraine, Ignat chose to represent Russia instead, stating that while the option existed, he had "no desire to play on the Ukrainian team" because the career opportunity was greater in Russia. Zemchenko began playing for Russia internationally in the Under-16 4 Nations Tournament.

References

External links

1992 births
Living people
HC Izhstal players
Metallurg Novokuznetsk players
HC Neftekhimik Nizhnekamsk players
Russian ice hockey forwards
Severstal Cherepovets players
HC Sibir Novosibirsk players
Ukrainian emigrants to Russia
Sportspeople from Kyiv